The Hundred of Bundey refers to a cadastral unit. It could be
 Hundred of Bundey (Northern Territory)
 Hundred of Bundey (South Australia)

See also
 Bundey (disambiguation)